Sara Khan (born 6 August 1989) is an Indian model and actress. She won the Miss Bhopal title in 2007. She is recognised for her role in Star Plus's show Sapna Babul Ka...Bidaai as Sadhna.

Early life
Khan was born on 6 August 1989 in Bhopal, India. Khan is a Sunni Muslim. She has a sister, Ayra Khan.

Career

Television

Khan started her career as a model. She made her acting debut with the popular Star Plus show Sapna Babul Ka...Bidaai (2007-2010) as Sadhna opposite Angad Hasija. She quit the show in June 2010 which remarked the end of her character. Khan then appeared in the Zee TV show Preet Se Bandhi Ye Dori Ram Milaayi Jodi (2010-2012) as Mona where she replaced Priyal Gor.

In 2013, Khan made her entry in the Life OK serial Junoon - Aisi Nafrat Toh Kaisa Ishq as Shaalu Pandey. She then played the role of Maya, an Icchhadhari Naagin in the popular Colors TV show Sasural Simar Ka (2014-2015). She was also seen in shows like V The Serial, Pyaar Tune Kya Kiya, Encounter and Tujhse Hi Rabta.

In 2015, Sara played Pavitra in &TV's Bhagyalaxmi. In 2016, she played Kuhu in &TV's Saubhagyalakshmi. In 2017, Khan did a cameo role in Star Plus's Dil Boley Oberoi as Mohini. She was then seen in the Star Plus show Jaana Na Dil Se Door as Kangana.

Reality television and other appearances 
In 2008, Khan appeared as a guest contestant on the show Kya Aap Paanchvi Pass Se Tez Hain?, along with Parul Chauhan who plays her onscreen sister in Sapna Babul Ka...Bidaai. The two of them played the game and then donated the winnings to the charity Help Age India. She also appeared in Amul Star Voice of India 2 alongside Angad Hasija, Parul Chauhan, and Kinshuk Mahajan on 20 September 2008 as a celebrity guest. She appeared on the popular TV show 10 Ka Dum, hosted by Salman Khan in August 2009 and hosted Dance Premier League, a dancing reality show that aired on Sony TV. In 2010, Khan was a contestant on Bigg Boss 4, the Indian version of the reality TV show Big Brother and stayed in the show for 10 weeks until she got evicted on Day 69.

In 2013, Khan appeared in Life OK's Welcome - Baazi Mehmaan-Nawaazi Ki as a contestant and later went on to host the show BIG Fame Star. She also appeared in Nach Baliye 6 along with Paras Chhabra as a wildcard contestant but couldn't get selected. In 2014, Khan was seen in Ekta Kapoor's Box Cricket League. She also appeared in two comedy shows Comedy Classes and Comedy Nights Bachao. In 2018, Khan appeared in the music video Tere Jism with Angad Hasija.

In July 2022, she entered Colors TV's Spy Bahu as Ahana. Since November 2022, she portrayed Tanya Rastogi in Dangal TV's Palkon Ki Chhaon Mein 2.

Personal life
Khan was married to TV actor Ali Merchant, a Shia Muslim in an Islamic wedding ceremony at Bigg Boss 4 in 2010, but divorced him after two months in 2011. Close friends of the couple stated that the couple was paid  for the marriage. The Colors channel denied that it had paid them for the marriage and called it their personal wish. After the divorce she called the marriage a nightmare. Merchant said in an episode of the reality show Sach Ka Saamna that he had married for publicity and that marrying Khan was the biggest mistake of his life.

Filmography

Films

Television

Special appearances

Music videos

Awards

See also 
List of Hindi television actresses

References

External links

 Sara Khan at IMDb
 
 

Living people
1989 births
Actresses from Bhopal
Indian television actresses
Indian soap opera actresses
Indian film actresses
Actresses in Hindi cinema
Actresses in Hindi television
Actresses in Urdu television
Indian Sunni Muslims
Female models from Madhya Pradesh
Indian expatriate actresses in Pakistan
21st-century Indian actresses